Daik-U is a town in Daik-U Township, Bago District, Pegu region in Burma (Myanmar).

References

External links
"Daik-U Map — Satellite Images of Daik-U" Maplandia

Township capitals of Myanmar

Populated places in Bago Region